2nd Brigade Combat Team or 2 BCT is a designation for modularized brigades of the United States Army. It may refer to:

2nd Brigade Combat Team, 1st Cavalry Division (United States)
2nd Brigade Combat Team, 1st Armored Division (United States)
2nd Brigade Combat Team, 1st Infantry Division (United States)
2nd Brigade Combat Team, 2nd Infantry Division (United States)
2nd Brigade Combat Team, 3rd Infantry Division (United States)
2nd Brigade Combat Team, 4th Infantry Division (United States)
2nd Brigade Combat Team, 10th Mountain Division (United States)
2nd Brigade Combat Team, 25th Infantry Division (United States)
2nd Brigade Combat Team, 82nd Airborne Division
2nd Brigade Combat Team, 101st Airborne Division
2nd Brigade Combat Team, 34th Infantry Division (United States)
2nd Infantry Brigade (United States)

See also
 2nd Division (disambiguation)
 2nd Brigade (disambiguation)
 2nd Regiment (disambiguation)
 2 Squadron (disambiguation)